Cocktail is a 2020 Indian Tamil-language comedy film directed by debutante Ra.Vijaya Murugan, and starring Yogi Babu, Niviksha Naidu, Mithun Maheswaran, Pugazh, KPY Bala and Kawin. The film was released on 10 July 2020.

Cast 

Yogi Babu as Don
Niviksha Naidu as Ammu
Mithun Maheswaran as Anbu
Bala as Pandi
Pugazh as Local
 Kawin as Age
Meghana Ellen as Tamizheni
Sayaji Shinde as Rajamanickam
Mime Gopi as JP, gang leader
Mohamed Kuraishi as Ganesh, JP's assistant
Swaminathan as the flat secretary
Bava Lakshmanan as a security guard
Supergood Subramani as a police officer
Saravana Sakthi
Baby Siva as a 2nd Don

Release 
The film was initially scheduled to have a theatrical release in March 2020, but due to the COVID-19 pandemic, the makers opted for an OTT release directly on ZEE5 on 10 July 2020. The film features a cockatoo in an important role and is the first Indian film to feature the bird.

Music 
The songs are composed by Sai Bhaskar.

Critical reception
The Hindu stated "The film’s core plot is ripped from ‘The Hangover’ films, but the prudent way it has been shot could be a guide to filmmakers preparing to work under COVID-19 restrictions." The New Indian Express stated "It’s a compliment to films like Cocktail when they get reviewed, when we offer evidence that we have indeed subjected ourselves to their torment."

References

External links 

2020 comedy films
2020 direct-to-video films
2020 directorial debut films
2020 films
2020s Tamil-language films
Indian comedy films
Indian romantic drama films
ZEE5 original films